Kossuth may refer to:

Places

Hungary
 Kossuth tér, or Lajos Kossuth Square, Budapest
 Kossuth Lajos tér (Budapest Metro), a station on the M2 (East-West) line of the Budapest Metro

United States
 Kossuth, Indiana, an unincorporated place in Washington County, Indiana
 Kossuth County, Iowa
 Kossuth, Mississippi, a village
 Kossuth, Ohio, an unincorporated place in Auglaize County
 Kossuth Colony Historic District, an area in Dayton, Ohio
 Kossuth, Wisconsin

Other uses 
 Kossuth (surname)
Lajos Kossuth, Hungarian statesman
 "Kossuth" (Bartók), Sz. 75a, BB 31, a symphonic poem by Béla Bartók inspired by Lajos Kossuth
 Kossuth (Dungeons & Dragons), an elemental fire deity in the Dungeons & Dragons role-playing game

See also 
 Kossuth hat or slouch hat
 Kossuth Memorial, a statue of Lajos Kossuth in front of the Hungarian Parliament Building
 Kossuth Prize, a state award in Hungary
 Kossuth Rádió, a main public radio station of Hungary
 Kossuth Bridge, a bridge over the river Danube in Budapest from 1945 to 1960
 Košúty, a village and municipality in Galanta District, Trnava Region, south-west Slovakia